Closer is the sixth studio album by Canadian electronic music producer Richie Hawtin, and his fifth studio album under the alias Plastikman. It was released on October 21, 2003 by Minus and Novamute Records. It peaked at number 41 on the UK Independent Albums Chart.

Critical reception

Resident Advisor ranked Closer at number 56 on its list of the top 100 albums of the 2000s.

Track listing

Personnel
Credits adapted from liner notes.
 Richie Hawtin – music, production, artwork concept
 Rashad – mastering
 Constructure – design
 Vern Harvey – photography

Charts

References

External links
 

2003 albums
Richie Hawtin albums
Novamute Records albums
Paper Bag Records albums